Catherine Guzman (born January 24, 1990), better known by her ring name Leila Grey, is a Dominican-American professional wrestler, model and actress.  She is currently working for the American promotion All Elite Wrestling (AEW).

Professional wrestling career 
Grey debuted in 2020, wrestling in the independent circuit in Florida. She made her All Elite Wrestling debut on March 3, 2021, losing to Tay Conti on AEW Dark. On March 10, she made her AEW Dark: Elevation debut, losing to Diamante. On March 4, 2022, she made her television debut on AEW Rampage, losing to Serena Deeb. On June 29, following a loss to Jade Cargill on AEW Dynamite, Grey turned heel and aligned herself with Cargill, becoming one of The Baddies.

Personal life 
Guzman cites Melina, Sasha Banks and Trish Stratus among her inspirations in wrestling. Grey is currently engaged to professional wrestler Luke Kurtis.

Championships and accomplishments 
	Great Lakes Championship Wrestling
GLCW Women's Championship (1 time, current)
 Ohio Valley Wrestling
 OVW Women's Championship (3 times)
 Pro Wrestling 2.0
 PW2.0 Women's Championship (1 time)
 Pro Wrestling Illustrated
 Ranked No. 96 of the top 150 female wrestlers in the PWI Women's 150 in 2022

References

External links 

 

21st-century professional wrestlers
Living people
American female professional wrestlers
Dominican Republic female professional wrestlers
Professional wrestlers from New York City
All Elite Wrestling personnel
1990 births